In most styles of wrestling, opponents are matched based on weight class.

Olympic and international weight classes
In international competition, men's freestyle wrestling, men's Greco-Roman wrestling, and female wrestling utilize following weight classes as of 2018:

Women's wrestling
 50 kg (110 lbs)
 53 kg (117 lbs)
 55 kg (121 lbs) (non-Olympic class)
 57 kg (126 lbs)
 59 kg (130 lbs) (non-Olympic class)
 62 kg (137 lbs)
 65 kg (143. lbs) (non-Olympic class)
 68 kg (150 lbs)
 72 kg (159 lbs) (non-Olympic class)
 76 kg (168 lbs)

International youth weight classes

For men's freestyle and Greco-Roman wrestling
As of 2019, international freestyle wrestling and Greco-Roman wrestling for male youths are divided into three age categories: U15, cadets, and juniors.

U15 (male youths aged 14–15, as well as male youths at age 13 with a medical certificate and parental authorization) compete in freestyle and/or Greco-Roman wrestling in the following 10 weight classes:

 34–38 kg (75-84 lbs)
 41 kg (90 lbs)
 44 kg (97 lbs)
 48 kg (106 lbs)
 52 kg (115 lbs)
 57 kg (126 lbs)
 62 kg (137 lbs)
 68 kg (150 lbs)
 75 kg (165 lbs)
 85 kg (187 lbs)

Cadets (male youths aged 16–17, as well as male youths at age 15 with a medical certificate and parental authorization) compete in freestyle wrestling and/or Greco-Roman wrestling in the following 10 weight classes:

 41 to 45 kg (90 to 99 lbs)
 48 kg (106 lbs)
 51 kg (112 lbs)
 55 kg (121 lbs)
 60 kg (132 lbs)
 65 kg (143 lbs)
 71 kg (157 lbs)
 80 kg (176 lbs)
 92 kg (203 lbs)
 110 kg (243 lbs)

Juniors (men aged 18 to 20, as well as male youths at age 17 with a medical certificate and parental authorization) compete in freestyle wrestling and/or Greco-Roman wrestling in the following weight classes:

 57 kg (126 lbs)
 61 kg (134 lbs)
 65 kg (143 lbs)
 70 kg (154 lbs)
 74 kg (163 lbs)
 79 kg (174 lbs)
 86 kg (190 lbs)
92 kg (203 lbs)
97 kg (214 lbs)
125 kg (276 lbs)

Juniors over the age of 18 are allowed to participate in senior competitions with a medical certificate.

For women's freestyle wrestling
As of 2019, female youth compete in freestyle wrestling on an international level in one of four age categories: U15, cadets, and juniors.

U15 (female youths aged 14–15, and female youths at age 13 with a medical certificate and parental authorization) compete in freestyle wrestling in the following 10 weight classes:

 29 to 33 kg (64 to 73 lbs)
 36 kg (79 lbs)
 39 kg (86 lbs)
 42 kg (93 lbs)
 46 kg (101 lbs)
 50 kg (110 lbs)
 54 kg (119 lbs)
 58 kg (128 lbs)
 62 kg (137 lbs)
 66 kg (146 lbs)

Cadets (female youths aged 16–17, and female youths at age 15 with a medical certificate and parental authorization) compete in freestyle wrestling in the following 10 weight classes:

 36 to 40 kg (79 to 88 lbs)
 43 kg (95 lbs)
 46 kg (101 lbs)
 49 kg (108 lbs)
 53 kg (117 lbs)
 57 kg (126 lbs)
 61 kg (134 lbs)
 65 kg (143 lbs)
 69 kg (152 lbs)
 73 kg (161 lbs)

Juniors (female youths aged 18 to 20, and female youths at age 17 with a medical certificate and parental authorization) compete in freestyle wrestling in the following eight weight classes:

 50 kg (110 lbs)
 53 kg (117 lbs)
 55 kg (121 lbs)
 57 kg (126 lbs)
 59 kg (130 lbs)
 62 kg (137 lbs)
 65 kg (143 lbs)
 68 kg (150 lbs)
 72 kg (159 lbs)
 76 kg (168 lbs)

Scholastic weight classes in the United States

Elementary school
Elementary school students competing in wrestling have multiple ways weight classes are determined.

"Madison system" - This is a popular tournament format where there are no weight classes and the tournament director pairs wrestlers into brackets (usually 8 or 16 man) based on weight at weigh-ins.  This is a popular method because it discourages "weight cutting" in young athletes.
Division-based system - In this system, the tournament director separates athletes by age (ex: Grade 2 and under, Grade 4 and under, and Grade 6 and under), and by weight class.  Weight class and division is at the tournament director's discretion.
Pure-weight based system - In this system, the athletes are not divided by age but rather just by weight class.  This is rarely used because it pairs younger, less experienced athletes with older, more experienced athletes.

Middle school
Wrestling weight classes for middle (junior high) school in the United States vary from state to state and are not regulated by the NFHS. The weight classes regulated by the OHSAA are the following:

 80 lbs
 86 lbs
 92 lbs
 98 lbs
 104 lbs
 110 lbs
 116 lbs
 122 lbs
 128 lbs
 134 lbs
 142 lbs
 150 lbs
 160 lbs
172 lbs
205 lbs
245 lbs

High school
High school students in the United States competing in scholastic wrestling do so in the following 14 weight classes set by the National Federation of State High School Associations (NFHS):
 106 lbs
 113 lbs
 120 lbs
 126 lbs
 132 lbs
 138 lbs
 145 lbs
 152 lbs
 160 lbs
 170 lbs
 182 lbs
 195 lbs
220 lbs
 285 lbs
 Heavyweight class was unlimited before 1988–89; capped at 275 lb (~125 kg) from 1988 to 1989 through 2005–06.

Other states have additional or modified weight classes, such as:
 99 lbs (in the state of New York;)
 98 lbs (in the state of Montana;)
 105 lbs (in place of the 103 lbs weight class) in Montana.
144, 150, 157, 165, 175, 190, and 215 lbs (in place of 145, 152, 160, 170, 195, and 220 lbs weight classes) in New Jersey.
172, 189 and 215 lbs (in place of the 170, 182, 195 and 220 lbs weight classes) in Pennsylvania.
 103, 112, 119, 125, 130, 135, 140, 145, 152, 160, 171, 189, 215 and 285 are the weight classes used in Michigan.

Collegiate weight classes in the United States
College and university students in the United States competing in collegiate wrestling do so in the following 10 weight classes set by the National Collegiate Athletic Association (NCAA):

 125 lb
 133 lb
 141 lb
 149 lb
 157 lb
 165 lb
 174 lb
 184 lb
 197 lb
 Heavyweight (183 lb to 285 lb)

Also:
 235 lb (Only the National Collegiate Wrestling Association (NCWA), which governs institutions outside of the NCAA, NAIA, and NJCAA, currently allows this weight class, which ranges from 174 lb to 235 lb.)

The NCWA has also approved the following eight weight classes for its women's division, which uses collegiate rules instead of the freestyle ruleset used in NCAA-recognized women's wrestling:
 105 lb
 112 lb
 121 lb
 130 lb
 139 lb
 148 lb
 159 lb
 200 lb

Women's college wrestling is also governed by the Women's Collegiate Wrestling Association (WCWA), an arm of the National Wrestling Coaches Association. The WCWA uses freestyle rules instead of collegiate rules. Freestyle wrestling became an NCAA-recognized sport as part of the Emerging Sports for Women program in 2020–21. The WCWA currently has 10 weight classes:

 101 lb
 109 lb
 116 lb
 123 lb
 130 lb
 136 lb
 143 lb
 155 lb
 170 lb
 191 lb

See also

Brazilian Jiu-Jitsu weight classes
Boxing weight classes
Kickboxing weight classes
Mixed martial arts weight classes
Taekwondo weight classes
Professional wrestling weight classes

References

External links 
www.fila-wrestling.com
www.nfhs.org wrestling rules changes 2006

 
Amateur wrestling